The canton of Brumath is an administrative division of the Bas-Rhin department, northeastern France. Its borders were modified at the French canton reorganisation which came into effect in March 2015. Its seat is in Brumath.

It consists of the following communes:

Bernolsheim
Bietlenheim
Bilwisheim
Brumath
Donnenheim
Eckwersheim
Gambsheim
Geudertheim
Gries
Hœrdt
Kilstett
Krautwiller
Kriegsheim
Kurtzenhouse
Mittelschaeffolsheim
Mommenheim
Olwisheim
Rottelsheim
Vendenheim
La Wantzenau
Weitbruch
Weyersheim

References

Cantons of Bas-Rhin